Juan Ángel Neira  (born 21 February 1989) is an Argentine professional footballer who plays as an attacking midfielder for Greek Super League club OFI.

Club career
In August 2011, Neira joined Lanús on a one-year loan from Gimnasia y Esgrima de La Plata, with an option to sign permanently. Lanús did not choose the option, and in 2012 Neira signed another one-year loan with the Spanish team Valladolid. On 31 July 2013, he joined the Mexican Ascenso MX side Estudiantes Tecos. The following years he played mostly in Mexico.

OFI
On 29 June 2018, he signed a year contract with newly Superleague club OFI. In his debut season with the Greek club, Juan appeared in 24 matches, scoring 6 goals and giving 1 assist. On 4 July 2019, he signed a contract renewal until the summer of 2021.

His first goal for the 2019–20 season came in a 3–1 home win against Asteras Tripolis, on 29 September 2019. On 6 October 2019, he scored in a triumphant 4–1 home win against Panionios. On 4 December 2019, Neira scored a brace in a 4–0 home win against Kavala, securing his team's spot in the round of 16 of the Greek Cup.

On 4 January 2020, he scored in a 2–1 home loss against Volos.

On 4 July 2020, he scored with a nice left-footed strike in a 2–2 home draw against PAOK.

He scored in the 2020–21 season's opener, a 1–1 home draw against Panetolikos, on 12 September 2020. On 23 November 2020, he scored with a penalty in an emphatic 4–1 away win against Volos. The following week, he scored with a penalty in a 2–1 win against PAS Giannina, the first at home for the season.

International career
In January 2009, Neira was selected to join the Argentina under-20 squad for the 2009 South American U-20 Championship held in Venezuela.

References

External links
 
    
 

1989 births
Living people
Footballers from La Plata
Argentine footballers
Argentina under-20 international footballers
Argentine expatriate footballers
Argentine Primera División players
La Liga players
Uruguayan Primera División players
Super League Greece players
Club de Gimnasia y Esgrima La Plata footballers
Club Atlético Lanús footballers
Real Valladolid players
Centro Atlético Fénix players
Newell's Old Boys footballers
Tecos F.C. footballers
Mineros de Zacatecas players
OFI Crete F.C. players
Expatriate footballers in Spain
Expatriate footballers in Uruguay
Expatriate footballers in Mexico
Expatriate footballers in Greece
Association football wingers